The 1965 World Table Tennis Championships men's singles was the 28th edition of the men's singles championship. 

Chuang Tse-Tung defeated Li Fu-Jung in the final, winning three sets to two to secure the title. It was the third consecutive win for Tse-Tung over Fu-Jung in World Championship finals.

Seeds

  Chuang Tse-tung
  Li Fu-Jung
  Chang Shih-lin
  Koji Kimura
  Hsu Yin-Sheng
  Wang Chih-liang
  Ichiro Ogimura
  Hans Alsér
  Wang Chia-Sheng
  Jung Kil-Hwa
  Ken Konaka
  Kjell Johansson
  Vajislav Markovic
  Hu Tao-pen
  Dorin Giurgiuca 
  Chou Lan-sun 
  Eberhard Schöler 
  Yu Chang-chun 
  Zoltán Berczik

Results

See also
List of World Table Tennis Championships medalists

References

-